Tops (stylized in all capital letters as TOPS) is a Canadian indie rock band from Montreal, Quebec, which currently consists of Jane Penny, David Carriere, Riley Fleck, and Marta Cikojevic. They were formed in 2011 following the disbandment of synthpop group Silly Kissers, of which Carriere, Penny, and Gillies were members, along with Arbutus Records recording artist Sean Nicholas Savage. TOPS are prominent within the Arbutus Records and Canadian indie music scenes. Their debut album, Tender Opposites, was released on February 28, 2012, in Canada and the United States, and October 1, 2012, in the rest of the world, to generally positive reviews. The album was named the eighth best album of 2012 by Gorilla vs. Bear. Their second studio album, Picture You Staring, was released in 2014 on Arbutus Records and featured artwork from LA-based artist Jessica Dean Harrison.

Discography

Studio albums
2012: Tender Opposites (Arbutus Records / Atelier Ciseaux)
2014: Picture You Staring (Arbutus Records)
2017: Sugar at the Gate (Arbutus Records)
2020: I Feel Alive (Musique TOPS)

Singles and EPs
2012: "Diamond Look" / "Easy Friends" (Arbutus Records / Atelier Ciseaux)
2014: "Change of Heart" / "Sleeptalker" (Arbutus Records)
2015: "Anything" (Arbutus Records) 
2015: "The Hollow Sound of the Morning Chimes" (Arbutus Records)
2019: "Echo of Dawn" / "Seven Minutes" (Musique TOPS)
2022: "Empty Seats" (Musique TOPS)

Videos

Band members

 Current members
Jane Penny (vocals, keyboard) (2011–present)
David Carriere (guitar) (2011–present)
Riley Fleck (drums) (2011–present)
 Marta Cikojevic (keyboard) (2017-present)

 Former members
Thom Gillies (bass) (2011–2013)
Madeline Glowicki (bass) (2013–2014)
Jenni Roberts (bass) (2014–2015)
Alana Marta DeVito (bass) (2015)
Jackson Macintosh (bass) (2016-2019)

References

External links
 TOPS at Arbutus Records

Musical groups from Montreal
Canadian indie rock groups
Musical groups established in 2011
Arbutus Records artists
2011 establishments in Quebec